Richard West (8 April 1916 – 18 June 1983) was an English first-class cricketer.

West was born in April 1916 at Berkhamsted, Hertfordshire. He was educated at Rugby School, before going up to Brasenose College, Oxford. While studying at Oxford, he played first-class cricket for Oxford University in 1936 and 1937, making eight appearances. Playing as a right-arm fast-medium bowler, he took 28 wickets at an average of 24.60. He took one five wicket haul, with figures of 5 for 74 against the British Army cricket team in 1937. A tailend batsman, he scored 43 runs with a high score of 18. In addition to playing first-class cricket for Oxford, West trialled for Surrey in 1935, but was unable to secure a place in their first team. He died in June 1983 at Dry Sandford, Berkshire.

References

External links

1916 births
1983 deaths
People from Berkhamsted
People educated at Rugby School
Alumni of Brasenose College, Oxford
English cricketers
Oxford University cricketers